Kitchen Creek is the name of several streams in the United States:

Kitchen Creek (Pennsylvania), a tributary of Huntington Creek in Luzerne County
Kitchen Creek (West Virginia), a tributary of Greenbrier Creek
Kitchen Creek (California), a tributary of Cottonwood Creek in San Diego County

See also
Kitchen Run